Fritz Freisler (1881–1955) was an Austrian screenwriter and film director of the silent era.

Selected filmography
 The Other I (1918)
 Love Story (1925)
 Her Highness Dances the Waltz (1926)
 The Arsonists of Europe (1926)
 King of the Centre Forwards (1927)
 Rich, Young and Beautiful (1928)

References

Bibliography
 Robert von Dassanowsky. Austrian Cinema: A History. McFarland, 2005.

External links

1881 births
1955 deaths
Austrian film directors
Austrian male screenwriters
20th-century Austrian screenwriters
20th-century Austrian male writers
People from Česká Třebová
German Bohemian people
Austrian people of German Bohemian descent